Fist Full of Bees may refer to:

 Fist Full of Bees (album), an album by Bride
 Fist Full of Bees (EP), an EP by The Brian Jonestown Massacre
 The painful sensation a baseball batter gets when he is jammed by a pitch